Mother of the Shadows is a 1914 American short silent drama film directed by George Osborne and featuring Tsuru Aoki, Sessue Hayakawa, John Keller, Joe Goodboy and J. Barney Sherry in important roles.

References

External links 
 

American silent short films
Silent American drama films
1914 drama films
1914 films
1914 short films
Films directed by George Osborne
American black-and-white films
1910s English-language films
1910s American films